Cyrtodactylus hantu is a species of gecko that is endemic to Sarawak in Malaysian Borneo. The specific name hantu is the Malay word for "ghost".

Cyrtodactylus hantu can reach at least  in snout–vent length.

References

Cyrtodactylus
Reptiles of Borneo
Geckos of Malaysia
Endemic fauna of Borneo
Endemic fauna of Malaysia
Reptiles described in 2021
Taxa named by Aaron M. Bauer
Taxa named by Indraneil Das
Taxa named by Todd R. Jackman
Taxa named by Benjamin R. Karin
Taxa named by Chan Kin Onn